The Heathrow Terminal 5 Transit is an automated people mover system (APM) at London Heathrow Airport in the United Kingdom. It operates in the Heathrow Terminal 5 complex and conveys air passengers between the main airport terminal and its satellite buildings.

History 
The Terminal 5 APM transit came into operation at the opening of Terminal 5 in 2008. It was the first ever deployment of the Innovia APM 200 vehicle. Initially the system had two stops, running between the main Terminal 5A and Terminal 5B, operated with two 3-car APM trains. In 2011, the line was extended to Terminal 5C and APM fleet was initially expanded to nine then later to ten vehicles.

Route 
The Heathrow Terminal 5 APM vehicles run in a dual-lane tunnel totalling  in length. The Transit System has three stations: the main Terminal 5A building (Gates A1-A23),  Terminal 5B  (Gates B32-B48),  and Terminal 5C (Gates C52-C66). The people movers operate exclusively "airside", meaning that the system can only by accessed by passengers who have first passed through airport security.

A completely separate personal rapid transit system, the London Heathrow Terminal 5 PRT, operates "landside" between the car parks and Terminal 5.

Vehicles 

The transit system is run with a small fleet of ten Bombardier Innovia APM 200 vehicles which convey over 6,500 passengers per hour in each direction.

References 
Citations

Sources

See also 
Stansted Airport Transit System

External links 

 

Airport people mover systems in the United Kingdom
Innovia people movers
Transit
Transport in the London Borough of Hillingdon
Railway lines opened in 2008
2008 establishments in England